Giovanna Huyke-Souffront (born 21 December 1956), known as Giovanna Huyke and "Chef Giovanna", is a Puerto Rican celebrity chef  and an international culinary leader often referred to as the “Julia Child of Puerto Rico".

Biography 

Huyke was born in San Juan, Puerto Rico on 21 December 1956. Her mother is Alice Huyke, a celebrated cooking teacher in Puerto Rico for over 30 years, and Hector Huyke-Colon, a civil engineer and architect in Puerto Rico.  Huyke began her career in theater, obtaining a bachelor's degree in Dramatic Arts at Tulane University. While in New Orleans, she worked in Paul Prudehomme’s Louisiana Kitchen and as an assistant to Lee Barnes, and then moved on to New York City to work with renowned chef Felipe Rojas Lombardi. Huyke then returned to Puerto Rico and worked at the Caribe Hilton for one year, after which she founded Amadeus in San Juan, where she pioneered “nouvelle criollo”, which consists of native ingredients and recipes with classic techniques.  She was also the chef at Ali-Oli, founded by one of her mentors, Alfredo Ayala. Huyke founded the restaurants Don Juan in the El San Juan Hotel and Giovanna's Café.

Career
Over the later part of her 40+ year cooking history, Giovanna Huyke has been credited with leading a transformation of Puerto Rican cuisine in two main areas: i) by emphasizing local ingredients along with traditional cooking methods and ii) by constructing lighter and healthier Puerto Rican dishes, without sacrificing traditional Puerto Rican flavor.

Huyke recently competed in Food Network's TV show "Beat Bobby Flay. She has also been featured on Good Morning America, Pierre Franney’s Cooking in America, AARP VIVA, Burt Wolf's Travels and Traditions, and Univision’s Despierta. Her work has been published in The New York Times, Bon Appetit, Food and Wine, Shape en Español, Vanidades and Cristina. She has additionally published six cookbooks and 20 recipe booklets showcasing her culinary creations.

Huyke is currently serving as a global culinary ambassador for Puerto Rican cooking by consulting for various restaurant projects, serving as menu-designer and composer, speaking at various cooking events, and serving as judge at various Puerto Rican culinary events, including Saborea 2016. She was most recently the Executive Chef at Mio Restaurant in Washington, DC, which has been called the “Embassy of Latin America in DC” by Washingtonian Magazine. Huyke was critiqued by Washington Post food critic Tom Sietsema, calling one of her specialties a “last meal request” and leading Mio to be listed in the Washington Post “Top Forty Fall Dining Guide” restaurant list and the Washingtonian Magazine's “Top 100 Restaurants”.

Awards / Accomplishments 

 Host of a daily cooking show called Giovanna's Kitchen (“La Cocina de Giovanna”), which was broadcast uninterrupted for over 23 years in Puerto Rico
 Host of a weekly cooking show called En Casa con Giovanna, which is referenced in the 2013 book Eating Puerto Rico: A History of Food, Culture and Identity
 Host of a dinner party cooking show called Giovanna Primetime
Walmart/Amigo spokesperson, writing recipes and cooking techniques and tips for the in-store cooking magazine
 Procter & Gamble spokesperson in Puerto Rico for “Brand Saver” coupon, cooking and healthy living magazine and P&G's Brand Saver web portal called P&G Every Day
 Served as culinary ambassador from Puerto Rico to Japan, sponsored by the Puerto Rican tourism bureau
 Weekly writer for Miami Herald/el Nuevo Herald and El Nuevo Dia

TV Shows 

Giovanna Huyke's TV shows have included:
 La Cocina de Giovanna, which was broadcast uninterrupted for over 23 years in Puerto Rico
 At home with Giovanna, showcasing recipes, arts, crafts and home decorating ideas
 Giovanna Primetime, a dinner party cooking show

Restaurants 

 La Fábrica Central Restaurant (Central Square Cambridge, Ma) 2018-Current
 K Paul's Louisiana Kitchen (New Orleans, LA) - Chef Paul Prudehomme's landmark restaurant
  (New Orleans, LA) - Chef Giovanna served as an assistant to one of the best-known culinarians in New Orleans
 Dean and Deluca Gourmet Food Store (New York City) - Chef Giovanna worked with Renowned Peruvian Chef Felipe Rojas as he was the founding chef of Dean and Deluca, and whose other experience included serving as James Beard's assistant at the James Beard Cooking School, serving as the Chef/Owner of The Ballroom restaurant in Chelsea and being named America's Bicentennial chef in 1976.
' (San Juan, Puerto Rico) -  Chef Giovanna began to pioneer a new method of cooking consisting of native ingredients and recipes with classic techniques. 
 Ali-Oli (San Juan, Puerto Rico) -  founded by one of Chef Giovanna's mentors, Alfredo Ayala
 Don Juan Restaurant at the El San Juan Hotel and Casino (San Juan, Puerto Rico) -  The first restaurant Chef Giovanna founded
 Giovanna's Cafe (San Juan, Puerto Rico) -  Chef Giovanna's second restaurant

Books 

 A tu Salud
 Cocina con Giovanna Celebraciones
 Entremeses-Alice and Giovanna Huyke
 La Cocina De Giovanna #1
 La Cocina De Giovanna #2
 La Cocina De Giovanna #3
 La Cocina De Giovanna #4
 La Cocina De Giovanna #5
 La Cocina De Giovanna #6
 La Cocina De Giovanna #7
 La Cocina De Giovanna #8
 La Cocina De Giovanna #9
 La Cocina De Giovanna #10
 La Cocina De Giovanna #11
 La Cocina De Giovanna #12
 La Cocina De Giovanna #13
 La Cocina De Giovanna #14
 La Cocina De Giovanna #15
 La Cocina De Giovanna #16
 La Cocina De Giovanna Huyke
 La Cocina De Giovanna-Primera Temporada
 La Cocina Puertorriquena De Hoy Por Giovanna Huyke
 Postres Variados-Alice and Giovanna Huyke
 Puerto Rico Does it Better-The Recipe Book

References 

People from San Juan, Puerto Rico
Puerto Rican chefs
1956 births
Living people
Tulane University alumni